Carpenter's Station, Tennessee, is an unincorporated historical community in Lawrence County, Tennessee established in 1884. The name was changed to Springer's Station when the railroad was extended to the community.

References

Unincorporated communities in Lawrence County, Tennessee
Unincorporated communities in Tennessee